Fire monster may refer to:
Fire Monsters Against the Son of Hercules
Gigantis, the Fire Monster

See also
Smoke monster